The Burch Sisters was an American country music trio composed of sisters Cathy, Charlene and Cindy Burch. Their debut single, "Everytime You Go Outside I Hope It Rains," was their only song to reach the Top 40 of the Billboard Hot Country Singles & Tracks chart, peaking at No. 23 in 1988. It was included their debut album, New Fire, issued in 1989 by Mercury Nashville.

Discography

Albums

Singles

Guest singles

Music videos

References

External links
[ The Burch Sisters] at Allmusic

Country music groups from Florida
Musical groups from Jacksonville, Florida
Sibling musical trios
Mercury Records artists
Musical groups established in 1988
Musical groups disestablished in 1990
1988 establishments in Florida